CoolToday Park is a ballpark in North Port, Florida, located in the southern portion of Sarasota County,  south of Sarasota, Florida. It is the spring training home of the Atlanta Braves of Major League Baseball. The ballpark opened on March 24, 2019, with the Braves' 4-2 win over the Tampa Bay Rays.

The Braves' $140 million project was funded by private and public sources. Sarasota County contributed $21.2 million through hotel bed tax dollars. The state of Florida put in $20 million after showing the Braves arrival would add $1.7 billion economic impact on the area over the team's 30-year lease. Mattamy Homes, a private developer, donated the land and $4.7 million. The city of North Port contributed $4.7 million and Wellen Park, the planned community within North Port that houses the facility, ran the construction and development. The Braves committed a 30-year lease, annual payments to Wellen Park, and at a minimum the first $18 million in the cost of the complex.

History

Planning
In 2015, the Atlanta Braves began looking for a new Spring Training home. From 1997 to 2019, the Braves held spring training at Champion Stadium near Orlando. To reduce travel times the team sought a new spring home in Florida to get closer to other teams' facilities.

In April 2016, the Braves and Sarasota County officials announced they were in formal negotiations.  The Braves and Sarasota County began discussing a  site in the Wellen Park master-planned community in North Port.

In January 2017, the Braves and Sarasota County announced that they had entered formal negotiations. Six weeks after the Braves entered exclusive negotiations with Sarasota County, Fla., about a new spring-training facility, the parties reached agreement on the key terms of a proposed deal. The term sheet describes a $75.4 million facility to be built in the city of North Port and funded by Sarasota County, the state of Florida, North Port, the Braves and a private developer.

City and County approval

On February 28, 2017, the planned deal for a new Atlanta Braves spring training stadium received its first approval. The initial agreement, known as a term sheet, outlines some of the basic finance, construction and operating commitments for baseball stadium. The Sarasota County Commission voted 4-1 to approve the terms. On May 9, 2017, the Sarasota County Commission unanimously endorsed the plan to revise the distribution of the county's tourist development tax, collected on overnight stays at hotel rooms and short-term rentals. The county plans to borrow about $22 million for the project and pay it back using a portion of the tourist tax funds, now specifically designated for the new Braves complex and the Baltimore Orioles' Ed Smith Stadium in Sarasota, without raising the tax itself.

On May 23, 2017, the Sarasota County Commission voted unanimously to approve an operating agreement that spells out the terms and conditions of a new facility for the Braves and a non-relocation agreement that requires the team to hold spring training in the complex for 30 years. The 48-page operating agreement sets a targeted completion date of January 15, 2019, for construction of the facility, which is to be built in the Sarasota County city of North Port.

In June 2017, Wellen Park submitted the final grant application for $20 million in state stadium funding necessary to complete the $75 million to $80 million proposed public-private financing deal. Also, North Port city leaders endorsed a licensing agreement with the Braves that allows for regular public use of the complex outside of baseball games. This satisfied concerns that commissioners have raised over the past few months.

On July 25, 2017, the North Port City Commission voted 3-2 to pay $4.7 million of sales tax money to help fund the spring training complex. On September 1, 2017, it was announced that the Florida Department of Economic Opportunity had conditionally approved $20 million that rounded out funding for the project. On September 12, 2017, the Sarasota County commissioners unanimously approved the agreements.

Commissioners also approved an interlocal agreement that outlines rights and responsibilities between the county and the West Villages Improvement District. The district was responsible for the design and construction of the training facility.  After the park was completed ownership was transferred to the county. On September 19, 2017, the plan received its final public approval from the North Port City Commission.

Construction
By September 2017, crews had started preparatory studies and surveys of the site. On September 1, 2017, the Braves announced Mike Dunn as the new Vice President of Florida Operations. Dunn oversaw development of the new spring-training complex and on October 16, 2017, local officials and team executives formally broke ground on the site of the planned $100 million stadium complex. Braves Vice Chairman John Schuerholz welcomed a crowd of more than 100 fans, residents and local elected officials as new "friends and neighbors” to the team during a short opening ceremony in the sweltering heat.

Sarasota-based Tandem Construction and Southfield, MI based Barton Malow was in charge of project. The construction schedule was to complete the stadium in time for when pitchers and catchers report to camp in February 2019. However, on January 31, 2018, the Braves announced they would extend their lease with Disney's ESPN Wide World of Sports through April 2019 "to ensure there is enough time to complete” the new facility. The team held their 2019 spring training at Disney and played their final spring training home game at the new facility.

In June 2018, 30% of the construction was complete. On December 4, 2018, North Port announced a 20-year stadium naming-rights deal with CoolToday, a local air conditioning, heating, plumbing and electrical services company, in which the park's name was unveiled: CoolToday Park. At the completion of the park the costs for the project had increased to $140 million.

Design

CoolToday Park features 6,200 fixed seats that can accommodate up to 8,000, including the berm and standing room, team clubhouse, training facilities, a half-dozen practice baseball fields, six multi-use fields and space for the team's sports medicine academy. The complex is envisioned to become the heart of a planned "town center" commercial and residential district that will create opportunities for the college and nearby medical practices to partner with the team and its affiliates.

The stadium itself sits on the north end of the tract, just south of the site of a planned new elementary and middle school campus. A public plaza area abutting West Villages Parkway is planned and will be used as special event space when the team is not in town. The multi-use fields will be used as grass parking to expand capacity during spring training and as public fields for the new schools or new tournaments. The team's sports medicine, fitness and physical therapy academy are also on the site.

The ballpark incorporates several familiar facets from other Grapefruit League facilities. The clubhouse behind the right field fence is reminiscent of Charlotte Sports Park. An outfield grandstand is similar to Bradenton's LECOM Park. The berm in left field is common to many spring training facilities. The ballpark has a left-field tiki bar, as does the Phillies' Spectrum Field in Clearwater.

The outfield dimensions mirror those of Truist Park, the Braves' MLB home.

Opening

After construction delays, the park wasn't complete before the 2019 season, however, on March 24, 2019, the Braves held the first game at the park at the end of the Spring Training season. Many former Braves players were in attendance, including Hank Aaron. After a pregame ribbon-cutting and a ceremonial first pitch by former Braves player Terry Pendleton, former Braves manager Bobby Cox proclaimed "play ball!" Kevin Gausman threw the first pitch and the Braves won 4-2 over the Tampa Bay Rays.

External links

Official website

References

Major League Baseball venues
Atlanta Braves stadiums
Braves
Buildings and structures in Sarasota County, Florida
Grapefruit League venues
Sports venues completed in 2019
2019 establishments in Florida
Atlanta Braves spring training venues
North Port, Florida